Marc Hayashi is an American actor and director. He was an early member of the Asian American Theater Company.

Selected filmography

References

External links

Living people

Year of birth missing (living people)
20th-century American male actors
American male actors of Japanese descent
American male film actors
American film actors of Asian descent